Siegfried Adler (born 29 March 1943) is a German racing cyclist. He rode in the 1968 Tour de France.

References

External links
 

1943 births
Living people
German male cyclists
People from Görlitz
Cyclists from Saxony
20th-century German people